Ntore Habimana (born August 15, 1997) is a Canadian-born Rwandan basketball player for the APR of the Rwanda Basketball League (RBL). He is a member of the Rwanda national team. His position has been described as a point forward.

Early life 
Habimana was born in Mississauga, Ontario to a Rwandan father and Burundian mother, who had moved to Canada in 1994. As a kid, he idolized Vince Carter.

College career 
Habimana played five seasons of U Sports men's basketball for the Wilfrid Laurier Golden Hawks and averaged 10.1 points in his final season. On February 18, 2020, he had a career-high 20 points against the Waterloo Warriors.

Professional career 
On March 2, 2022, Habimana signed his first professional contract with REG BBC of the Rwanda Basketball League (RBL) and the Basketball Africa League (BAL). He was not on the roster for the 2022 BAL Playoffs. Habimana won the 2022 RBL championship with REG.

On July 22, 2022, Habimana signed with the Edmonton Stingers.

On October 6, 2022, he signed a 2-year contract with APR.

National team career 
Since 2021, Habimana is a member of the Rwanda men's national basketball team.

References

Edmonton Stingers players
Rwandan men's basketball players
REG BBC players
Living people
1997 births
Basketball people from Ontario
Sportspeople from Mississauga
Wilfrid Laurier Golden Hawks players
Canadian men's basketball players